A memento is a keepsake or souvenir of remembrance.

Memento may also refer to:

Film and television
Memento (film), a 2000 film directed by Christopher Nolan 
"Memento" (Stargate SG-1), an episode of Stargate SG-1

Music
Memento (band), a musical group
Memento (Booka Shade album)
Memento (Dead Can Dance album)
Memento (Soel album)
"Memento" (single), by Közi
Memento Materia, a record label
Memento (Böhse Onkelz album)

Other
Memento (novel), by Radek John
Memento pattern, a software design pattern
Memento Project, a web archiving project

See also
Memento mori (disambiguation)
Momento (disambiguation)